İsmail Demirci (born 13 November 1984) is a Turkish actor.

Demirci was born in 1984 in Ankara. His family, who immigrated from Bulgaria, is of Turkish descent. In 2009, he graduated from Anadolu University State Conservatory with a degree in theatre studies. 

He made his television debut in 2010 with a role in the Türkan series. He continued his career by appearing in recurring roles in series such as Anneler ile Kızları, Mor Menekşeler, Ben Onu Çok Sevdim, Kurtlar Vadisi Pusu, Reaksiyon, Fabrika Kızı, Serçe Sarayı, Muhteşem Yüzyıl: Kösem, Babamın Günahları and Mehmed: Bir Cihan Fatihi. In 2014, he was cast in the movie Tut Sözünü, followed by Babaların Babası in 2016, and Posta Kutusu in 2017. For his performance in Posta Kutusu, he won the Best Actor award at the Krajina Film Festival. In 2018, he briefly appeared in the Show TV series Çarpışma. In 2019, he was cast in a leading role in Kuzey Yıldızı İlk Aşk.

Filmography 
 İyilik (Murat Karacakaya) - 2022
 Yalancılar ve Mumları (Engin Sezer) - 2021
 Kuzey Yıldızı İlk Aşk (Kuzey Mollaoğlu) - 2019–2021
 Çarpışma (Galip) - 2018
 Mehmed: Bir Cihan Fatihi (Şehzade Orhan) - 2018
 Babamın Günahları (Reha) - 2018
 Babaların Babası (Berk Çetin) - 2016
 Muhteşem Yüzyıl: Kösem (Kemankeş Kara Mustafa Pasha) - 2016–2017
 Fabrika Kızı (Ferhat) - 2015 
 Serçe Sarayı (Ramazan) - 2015
 Tut Sözünü - 2014
 Reaksiyon (Tekin) - 2014
 Kurtlar Vadisi Pusu (Erkan) - 2012–2013
 Ben Onu Çok Sevdim (Talat) - 2013–2014
 Mor Menekşeler (Harun) - 2012
 Anneler ile Kızları (Sedat) - 2011
 Sessiz Gece (Ozan)
 Türkan (Assistant Doctor Mehmet)
 İki Aile

As voice actor 

 İrfan in University (narrator) (2013)

References

External links 
 
 

Living people
1984 births
Turkish male television actors
Turkish male film actors
Male actors from Ankara
21st-century Turkish male actors